During the 1970–71 English football season, Arsenal F.C. competed in the Football League First Division where it became just the fourth side in history to win the league and FA Cup double. Having defeated Anderlecht in the Inter-Cities Fairs Cup Final the previous year, Arsenal defeated Manchester United 4–0 in the first home game. For the first time in their history, Arsenal remained unbeaten at home for the entirety of the league campaign, losing just once there in all competitions – 0–2 to Crystal Palace in the Football League Cup fourth round replay.

The defence of the Fairs Cup ended with a quarter-final defeat to West Germans FC Koln on away goals, but Stoke City lost after a replay in the FA Cup semi-final in April.

Nearest challengers Leeds United had already finished their season, standing one point clear of the Gunners. Thus, a win would clinch Arsenal the title, as would a 0–0 draw, as the goal average system(the division of goals scored by goals conceded) was still being used.

At White Hart Lane, they played Tottenham Hotspur, the last side to win the double, in the 1960–61 season, and Arsenal won, going on to Wembley to defeat Liverpool.

Final league table

Results
Arsenal's score comes first

Legend

Football League First Division

FA Cup

League Cup

Inter-Cities Fairs Cup

Squad

References

Arsenal F.C. seasons
Arsenal
English football championship-winning seasons